Pascal Marinot (died 23 February 2019) was a French slalom canoeist who competed in the 1980s. He won a silver medal in the K-1 team event at the 1985 ICF Canoe Slalom World Championships in Augsburg.

References

French male canoeists
Medalists at the ICF Canoe Slalom World Championships
Year of birth missing
2019 deaths